Pultenaea hispidula, commonly known as rusty bush-pea, is a species of flowering plant in the family Fabaceae and is endemic to south-eastern continental Australia. It is an erect, spreading shrub with many drooping branches, oblong to egg-shaped leaves with the narrower end towards the base, and yellow to pale orange and red flowers.

Description
The flowers are arranged in leaf axils in dense clusters near the ends of short side branches.

Taxonomy and naming
Pultenaea hispidula was first formally described in 1864 by George Bentham in Flora Australiensis from an unpublished description by Robert Brown who collected  the type specimens near the Georges River. The specific epithet (hispidula) means "hispid".

Distribution and habitat
Rusty bush-pea grows in forest, sometimes in heath and is found in coastal New South Wales, south from the Hawkesbury River, south of the Great Dividing Range in Victoria, and in the south east of South Australia.

References

hispidula
Flora of New South Wales
Flora of Victoria (Australia)
Flora of South Australia
Plants described in 1864
Taxa named by George Bentham